Excess, Betrayal...And Our Dearly Departed is the fourth album by American punk rock band The Generators. It was released on April 6, 2003, on People Like You Records in Europe and Japan, and in the USA in December 2004 by Fiend Music. Excess. Betrayal was a musical turning point for the band, seeing a more darker & emotional direction. After a short hiatus and line up change in early 2003, the band teamed up with longtime producer Rich Mouser in creating one of the band's most notable release.

Track listing 
All songs by Dagger/Doosky unless otherwise noted.
 "Roll Out The Red Carpet" (Dagger/Doosky/Danny)
 "Skeletons"
 "New Disease"
 "Thirty Seconds" (Dagger/Danny/Doosky)
 "My Curse"
 "Out Of The Shadows"
 "Wasting Your Time"
 "Dying In A Rock N' Roll Band"
 "Transmitter"
 "Tranquilized"

5 Bonus tracks were included on the US release from the upcoming The Winter Of Discontent

Credits 
Doug Dagger – Lead Vocals
Sir Doosky – Lead & Rhythm Guitars, Acoustic Guitar, Vocals
Danny Damned – Guitar on "Skeletons", Piano on "Thirty Seconds", "Dying in a Rock N'Roll Band"
Don Osterberg- Bass & Backing Vocals
Dirty Ernie – Drums & Backing vocals
Cover Illustration by Munk One

External links 
Official website

The Generators albums
2003 albums